Gijze Stroboer (born May 24, 1954 in Amsterdam) is a former competitive water polo player from the Netherlands, who participated in two consequentive Summer Olympics. On his debut, at the Munich Games in 1972, he finished in seventh position with the Dutch Men's Team. Four years later in Montreal, Quebec, Canada, Stroboer won the bronze medal with the Dutch squad.

See also
 List of Olympic medalists in water polo (men)

External links
 

1954 births
Living people
Dutch male water polo players
Olympic bronze medalists for the Netherlands in water polo
Water polo players at the 1972 Summer Olympics
Water polo players at the 1976 Summer Olympics
Water polo players from Amsterdam
Medalists at the 1976 Summer Olympics
20th-century Dutch people